

Lago Yusala is a lake in the Beni Department, Bolivia. At an elevation of 170 m, its surface area is 13.67 km2.

References

Lakes of Beni Department